Chance the Idol (German: Die Spielerin) is a 1927 German silent film directed by Graham Cutts and starring Jack Trevor, Agnes Esterhazy and Harry Liedtke. It was based on a play by Henry Arthur Jones. Cutts was working in Germany at the time for Gainsborough Pictures.

Cast
 Jack Trevor as Golding
 Agnes Esterhazy as Ellen 
 Harry Liedtke as Ryves 
 Gertrud de Lalsky as Lady Nowell 
 Philipp Manning as Mr. Farndon 
 Dene Morel as Alan 
 Frida Richard as Mrs. Farndon 
 Elza Temary as  Sylvia

Bibliography
 Cook, Pam. Gainsborough Pictures. Cassell, 1997.
 Wood, Linda. British Films 1927-1939. British Film Institute, 1986.

External links

1927 films
German drama films
German silent feature films
Films of the Weimar Republic
1927 drama films
Films directed by Graham Cutts
Films set in London
Films set in England
German films based on plays
National Film films
German black-and-white films
Silent drama films
1920s German films
1920s German-language films